Povratak Katarine Kožul is a 1989 Croatian film directed by Slobodan Praljak and starring Alma Prica and Mustafa Nadarević.

Sources
Povratak Katarine Kožul

External links
 

1989 films
1980s Croatian-language films
Croatian drama films
1989 directorial debut films
1989 drama films
Yugoslav drama films